Guns of the Pecos is a 1937 American Western film directed by Noel M. Smith and written by Harold Buckley. The film stars Dick Foran, Anne Nagel, Gordon Hart, Joseph Crehan, Eddie Acuff and Robert Middlemass. The film was released by Warner Bros. on January 2, 1937.

Plot

Cast  
 Dick Foran as Steve Ainslee
 Anne Nagel as Alice Burton
 Gordon Hart as Major Burton
 Joseph Crehan as Captain Norris
 Eddie Acuff as Jeff Carter
 Robert Middlemass as Judge L.F. Blake
 Fay Holden as Aunt Carrie Burton
 Wild Bill Elliott as Wellman
 Monte Montague as Luke
 Milton Kibbee as Carlos
 Bud Osborne as Jake, Blake's Henchman
 Cliff Saum as Bartender
 Henry Otho as Hank Brady
 Bob Burns as Bob Jordan
 Douglas Wood as Texas Governor

References

External links 
 
 
 
 

1937 films
American Western (genre) films
1937 Western (genre) films
Warner Bros. films
Films directed by Noel M. Smith
American black-and-white films
1930s English-language films
1930s American films